Miguel Ituarte (born 1968, Getxo) is a Basque Spanish pianist.

Ituarte began piano lessons at the Bilbao Conservatory with Isabel Picaza and Juan Carlos Gómez Zubeldia, and then was trained at the Madrid Conservatory studying with Almudena Cano. In Amsterdam, he studied at the Sweelinck Conservatorium with Jan Wijn. In 1995, he won the XXXVII Premio de Jaén and the IV Fundación Guerrero Competition, and was a finalist at Santander's XIII Paloma O'Shea Competition. He has performed internationally.

References
 (in spanish)

Fundación Juan March

1968 births
Living people
Spanish classical pianists
Male classical pianists
People from Getxo
Conservatorium van Amsterdam alumni
21st-century classical pianists
21st-century male musicians
Spanish male musicians